Denise Louise Faustman (born 1958) is an American physician and medical researcher. An associate professor of medicine at Harvard University and director of the Immunobiology Laboratory at Massachusetts General Hospital, her work specializes in diabetes mellitus type 1 (formerly called juvenile diabetes) and other autoimmune diseases. She has worked at Massachusetts General Hospital in Boston since 1985.

Education and career
Faustman was born in Royal Oak, Michigan in 1958. In 1978, she received her BS in zoology and chemistry from the University of Michigan.  She earned a PhD in transplantation immunology in 1982 and an MD in 1985 from the Washington University School of Medicine in St. Louis, Missouri.  She did her internship and residency in medicine at Massachusetts General Hospital.

Research
Faustman's current research is based on the observation that autoreactive T cells (T cells that mistakenly attack the body's own cells and tissues) are more sensitive than normal T cells to the effects of TNF-alpha (TNF-α), a cytokine that influences the immune system. Under some conditions, TNF-α causes T cells to undergo apoptosis, or programmed cell death. Faustman's hypothesis is that certain autoimmune diseases can be treated by stimulating TNF-α to trigger apoptosis in autoimmune T cells.

Prior to entering human clinical trials, Faustman's approach was tested in non-obese diabetic mice (NOD mice), a strain of mice that spontaneously develops type 1 diabetes. Injecting the mice with a common inflammatory agent that increases the production of TNF-α, called complete Freund's adjuvant (CFA), and a preparation of spleen cells reversed type 1 diabetes in mice with end-stage disease and allowed the beta islet cells to regenerate.

Faustman hypothesized that this regeneration may be attributed in part to the re-differentiation of the spleen cells – that although the splenic stem cells were not obligatory for regeneration to occur, these cells could hasten regeneration. The source of islet cell regeneration is debated. Faustman's team was the first to document type 1 diabetes reversal in mice and in a subsequent phase I trial demonstrated successful human clinical results who had received the BCG vaccination. Researchers from three laboratories funded by the Juvenile Diabetes Research Foundation confirmed that Dr. Faustman's protocol can successfully reverse type 1 diabetes in end-stage mice; however, they did not find that the splenic cells played a role and suggested that the source of islet cell regeneration was proliferation of existing pancreatic islet cells. A research group led by a researcher from the U.S. National Institutes of Health (NIH) replicated Faustman's work in mice with type 1 diabetes.

Bacillus Calmette-Guerin vaccine

Former Chrysler chairman Lee Iacocca, whose wife died of type 1 diabetes complications and who has declared a desire to see the disease cured in his lifetime, is a patron of her work. The Iacocca Foundation helped raise the $11.5 million needed to support a Phase I human clinical trial (for safety) at Massachusetts General Hospital to test vaccination with Bacillus Calmette-Guerin (BCG), a weakened strain of bacteria that is used in the prevention of tuberculosis and in the treatment of bladder tumors and bladder cancer, as a potential treatment for advanced type 1 diabetes. Like CFA in the mouse (not approved for use in humans), BCG induces TNF-α production in humans. In some human trials, BCG was not found to prevent type 1 diabetes, or lead to type 1 diabetes remission in those who are newly diagnosed, although one study from Israel showed disease remission in newly diagnosed type 1 diabetes, and an observational study from Turkey suggested that multiple doses of the BCG vaccine in childhood may protect against the development of type 1 diabetes.  Faustman hypothesizes that the optimal dose of BCG was not utilized in previous trials. Faustman hypothesizes that BCG could induce a permanent gene expression that restores regulatory T cells (Tregs), helping to prevent the immune system attack which characterizes type 1 diabetes.

Clinical trials
Faustman and co-workers published efficacy data from the Phase I trial NCT00607230 in 2012. In the double-blind, placebo-controlled proof-of-concept study, six participants with long-term (mean duration of disease 15 years) type 1 diabetes were randomized to repeated BCG vaccinations (n=3) or placebo (n=3). The participants were matched to control subjects without diabetes (n=6) and also compared to reference subjects with and without the disease. Blood samples were monitored weekly for 20 weeks. Two of the three BCG-treated participants experienced a transient but statistically significant rise in C-peptide levels compared to reference subjects. Participants who received BCG vaccination also experienced a transient increase in the number of circulating dead autoreactive T cells against insulin. One participant who was randomized to the placebo arm also had similar rises in C-peptide and dead autoreactive T cells after unexpectedly developing an acute infection with the Epstein-Barr virus; it, like the BCG vaccination, is known to induce TNF. Faustman et al. concluded that BCG treatment or EBV infection transiently modified the autoimmunity that underlies advanced type 1 diabetes. The data from the Phase I trial has sparked some controversy regarding the scientific rigor of the study, and the JDRF and the ADA made a joint statement listing concerns with the trial.

Partial bibliography

References

External links
 
 
 
 
 
 
 
 
 
 
 
 
 
 
 
 

Living people
American immunologists
Harvard Medical School faculty
1958 births
People from Royal Oak, Michigan
American diabetologists
University of Michigan College of Literature, Science, and the Arts alumni
Washington University School of Medicine alumni